Roman Antoszewski (20 January 1935 – 27 November 2017) was a professor in plant physiology, born in Lidzbark Welski, Poland.

Professional Qualifications
 1957 - M.Sc. in Plant Physiology, University of  Łódź, Poland Analytica Chimica Acta
 1963 - Ph.D. in Plant Physiology, Jagiellonian University, Cracow, Poland
 1963/4 - Postdoctoral practice at Yale University, New Haven, Con., USA (research under Prof.Arthur Galston )
 1968 - D.Sc. (Habilitation) in Natural Sciences (Jagiellonian University), Cracow, Poland
 1974 - Professor in Natural Sciences (Belweder, presidential nomination)

Posts Held
 1982-1984 Visiting Professor at the Institute of Radioagronomy, Nuclear Research Centre, Jülich, Germany;
 1984-1988 Senior Lecturer in Biochemistry, Dept of Plant Science and Biochemistry, University of the West Indies, St. Augustine Trinidad and Tobago;
 1989-1990 Senior Research Fellow, Dept of Botany, National University of Singapore, Singapore;
 1991-1992 Hon. Assoc. Res. Fellow, Waikato University New Zealand;
 1993-2012 Director of Roman Research and Translation Co.Inc., Auckland, New Zealand
 2000 - Retired

Scientific Associations
 Since 1970 Member of the European Society of Nuclear Energy Application in Agriculture (ESNA), organizer of XI Working Group - Use of Isotopes in Plant Physiology;
 1976-1984 Member of the Committee of the Federation of the European Societies of Plant Physiology (FESPP);
 1979-1982 Chairman of Plant Biochemistry and Physiology Section of the Polish Botanical Society;
 1980-1982 President of the Federation of European Societies of Plant Physiology (FESPP);
 Committee Member of the International Council on Plant Nutrition until 1988;
 Member of the Organizing Committee of the Caribbean Academy of Science (1986-1988);
 Member of the Commission of Nuclear Energy Application in Agriculture of the V Dept. of Polish Academy of Sciences;
 Two awards for research achievements of the biochemistry team at the Research Institute of Pomology, Skierniewice Poland

Member of ...
 International Society for Horticultural Science(co-organizer of the XIX Intern. Horticultural Congress, Warsaw, 1974 - Editor-in-chief of Congress Proceedings, 5 vols);
 Polish Botanical Society (until 1982);
 Trinidad and Tobago Scientific Association – TTSA - (until 1988);
 American Society of Plant Physiologists (until 1989);
 Federation of European Societies of Plant Physiology;
 New Zealand Society of Plant Physiologists - (until 2004);
 New Zealand Society of Authors PEN New Zealand Inc.;
 The Auckland Polish Association;
 Co-founder of Polonia Cultural Foundation of New Zealand (2015)

Orders and decorations
 The Silver Cross of Merit (Srebrny Krzyż Zasługi);
 Knight's Cross of the Order of Polonia Restituta (Krzyż Kawalerski Orderu Polonia Restituta).

Published books & article 
 Translated into Polish Red runs the Vistula    ASIN: B0007BQDNU (1985) English historical book of Ron Jeffery - Nevron Associates Publ., Manurewa, Auckland;
 Novel "Kariera na trzy karpie morskie", Warszawa 2000; 
 Przyroda inaczej... czyli Ciekawostki; 
 Dziwy i dziwadła obyczajowe ... czyli Ciekawostki; 
 Historia inaczej ... czyli Ciekawostki - Kraków 2000; 
 Zbiór wiadomości niezwykłych, szokujących, mądrych, choć nie zawsze - Auckland 1995;
 Dziwy i dziwadła - Cinderella Books Warszawa 2001; 
 Few handbook for classes, University of the West Indies, 1985, 1986
 Article in: Analytica Chimica Acta - "A simple and rapid determination of small amounts of adenine The Analyst Volume: 85, Issue 1012, 1960 / 37, Issue 1, 1960 /  22, Issue C, 1960
 Article in: Biochemical and Biophysical Research Communications, Volume 43, Issue 1, 2 April 1971 "Peroxidase biosynthesis in pea roots as influenced by IAA treatment" BBRC article
 Cited - Brazhnikov, V.V. "Gas chromatography for space research" Chromatographia 1970
 Article in: Journal of Chromatography - "Homogenization and extraction of biological material for chromatographic purposes" 1959
 Atticle in: Die Naturwissenschaften - "Mikroextraktor für biochemische und chromatographische Zwecke" 1958

References

1935 births
2017 deaths
20th-century Polish botanists